"Isn't It a Shame" is a 1976 song written and composed by Randy Edelman. The song was first recorded by the girl group Labelle for their sixth studio album Chameleon (1976). "Isn't It a Shame" charted at number 18 on the US Hot R&B/Hip-Hop Songs chart. The song was later covered by Patti LaBelle live and included on her live album Live in Washington, D.C.

Charts

References

1976 songs
1976 singles
Labelle songs
Songs written by Randy Edelman